The 2020 Illinois State Redbirds football team represented Illinois State University as a member of the Missouri Valley Football Conference (MVFC)  during the 2020–21 NCAA Division I FCS football season. Led by 12th-year head coach Brock Spack, the Redbirds compiled an overall record of 1–3 with an identical in conference play, tying for seventh place in the MVFC. Illinois State played home games at Hancock Stadium in Normal, Illinois.

On March 21, 2021, Illinois State announced that it would opt out of the remainder of the 2021 spring season due to safety concerns related to the COVID-19 pandemic.

Schedule
Illinois State released their full schedule on July 15, 2019.

The Redbirds football team had non-conference games scheduled at Illinois on September 4, versus Eastern Illinois on September 12, and versus Dixie State on November 21. All were canceled prior to the scheduled start of the 2020 season.

On January 21, 2021, the Missouri Valley Football Conference office released an altered spring season schedule based on the participation of ten league schools.

Scheduled games against South Dakota State (March 27), Southern Illinois (April 3), North Dakota (April 10), and Missouri State (April 17) were canceled when the Redbirds opted out of the remainder of the spring season.

References

Illinois State
Illinois State Redbirds football seasons
Illinois State Redbirds football